In enzymology, a D-4-hydroxyphenylglycine transaminase is an enzyme that catalyzes the chemical reaction

D-4-hydroxyphenylglycine + 2-oxoglutarate  4-hydroxyphenylglyoxylate + L-glutamate

Thus, the two substrates of this enzyme are D-4-hydroxyphenylglycine and 2-oxoglutarate, whereas its two products are 4-hydroxyphenylglyoxylate and L-glutamate.

This enzyme belongs to the family of transferases, specifically the transaminases, which transfer nitrogenous groups.  The systematic name of this enzyme class is D-4-hydroxyphenylglycine:2-oxoglutarate aminotransferase. This enzyme is also called D-hydroxyphenylglycine aminotransferase.  It employs one cofactor, pyridoxal phosphate.

References

 
 

EC 2.6.1
Pyridoxal phosphate enzymes
Enzymes of unknown structure